Ousmane Kamissoko (born 28 August 1998) is a Malian footballer who plays as a forward for Guidars and the Mali national team.

International career
Kamissoko made his professional debut with the Mali national team 2020 African Nations Championship Final, a 2–0 loss to Morocco on 7 February 2021.

References

External links
 
 

1998 births
Living people
Malian footballers
Mali international footballers
Association football forwards
Malian Première Division players
21st-century Malian people
Mali A' international footballers
2020 African Nations Championship players